Blake David Moore (born June 22, 1980) is an American politician and former diplomat from the state of Utah.

Early life and education 
Moore was born and raised in Ogden, Utah. He attended Ogden High School, graduating in 1998. During high school, he was a quarterback for the football team. In 1997, he won the Wendy's High School Heisman. He is an Eagle Scout.

After graduating from high school, Moore enrolled at Utah State University on a football scholarship. His freshman year roommate was American-born Azerbaijani NBA player Spencer Nelson. During his freshman year, Moore's football scholarship was rescinded by a newly-installed football coach after he left to serve as a missionary for The Church of Jesus Christ of Latter-day Saints in Seoul, South Korea.

After returning from his mission, Moore transferred to the University of Utah, where he earned a Bachelor of Arts degree in behavioral science and business. He earned a master's in public policy and administration from Northwestern University.

Career 
Moore briefly served as a United States Foreign Service officer in the United States Department of State, and worked as a business consultant for the Cicero Group, a management consulting firm based in Salt Lake City.

U.S. House of Representatives

Elections

2020 

In a field of 12 primary candidates, Moore advanced out of the Republican nominating convention in second place, together with Weber County Commissioner Kerry Gibson. Two other candidates, Davis County commissioner Bob Stevenson and Kaysville mayor Katie Witt, also secured their spot in the primary by gathering signatures. During the party nominating process, Moore was criticized for not living within the congressional district. At the time, he resided on the east bench of Salt Lake City, 15 miles outside the district. Congressional candidates are not required to live inside the district they represent, only in the same state. Moore then won the four-way June 30 Republican primary with just over 30% of the vote.

In the general election, Moore defeated Democratic nominee Darren Parry with 69.5% of the vote to Parry's 30.4%. He took office on January 3, 2021, marking the first time an incumbent had not run in 18 years and maintaining Republican control of the district since 1980. Moore has said that despite being elected to one of the most powerful political bodies in the world, the title he most prizes is "Little League coach".

2022 

Moore faced two primary challengers, Tina Cannon and Andrew Badger. On May 15, State Senate President Stuart Adams endorsed Moore in an editorial in the Deseret News.

Tenure
Moore voted against the second impeachment of Donald Trump.

On May 19, 2021, Moore voted for bipartisan legislation to establish the January 6, 2021 commission meant to investigate the storming of the U.S. Capitol. The bill to establish this commission was blocked in the Senate. House Republican Leader Kevin McCarthy had earlier advocated for congressional action to form such a commission on January 13, stating that "[he thought] a fact-finding commission ... would be prudent." Moore voted against the currently operating United States House Select Committee on the January 6 Attack.

Moore was among the few House Republicans who voted to keep Liz Cheney as conference chair both times a vote was held. In an interview with the Deseret News editorial board, Moore stated he felt no pressure to vote one way or another from Republican leadership, and said it was important for the Republican leadership team to hold "broad appeal."

Moore failed to disclose stock trades on time as required by the STOCK Act. The total value of the stocks in question is unknown but is between $78,000 and $1.1 million. Moore has acknowledged paying a "late filing fee" to the House Committee on Ethics in July 2021; the value of that fee generally starts at $200.

Moore voted against the Infrastructure Investment and Jobs Act.

In the wake of the Taliban's conquering of Afghanistan, Moore introduced the Afghanistan Accountability Act to investigate what the Biden administration knew before deciding to leave Afghanistan.

As of November 2021, Moore voted with Joe Biden's preferred positions 16% of the time, according to FiveThirtyEight's tracker.

In 2021, Moore co-sponsored the Fairness for All Act, the Republican alternative to the Equality Act. The bill would prohibit discrimination on the basis of sex, sexual orientation, and gender identity, and protect the free exercise of religion.

On July 19, 2022, Moore and 46 other Republican Representatives voted for the Respect for Marriage Act, which would codify the right to same-sex marriage in federal law.

Committee assignments
 Committee on Armed Services
 Committee on Natural Resources
 House Budget Committee

Caucus memberships
 Republican Main Street Partnership
 Republican Study Committee
 Republican Governance Group

Personal life 
Moore and his wife, Jane Boyer, have three sons.

References

External links
 Representative Blake Moore official U.S. House website
 Blake Moore for Congress
 
Blake Moore – General
 

|-

1980 births
Living people
American Latter Day Saints
Northwestern University alumni
People from Ogden, Utah
Republican Party members of the United States House of Representatives from Utah
United States Foreign Service personnel
University of Utah alumni
American Mormon missionaries in South Korea
Latter Day Saints from Utah